Eižens is a Latvian masculine given name. The associated name day is November 13.

Notable people named Eižens
 Eižens Ārinš (1911–1987), Latvian mathematician and computer scientist
 Eižens Finks (1885–1958), Latvian photographer and clairvoyant 
 Eižens Laube (1880–1967), Latvian architect

References

Latvian masculine given names